Tango Distinto is a solo album by the trombonist Achilles Liarmakopoulos of Astor Piazolla's music.

This album is the first to appear with Piazzolla's music played by solo trombone.

With ten popular compositions it showcases the combination of the trombone with a number of different instruments and in the context of different moods that underline the composer's romantic, erotic, passionate, nostalgic, imaginative and always generously warm-spirited music.

Musicians 
 Achilles Liarmakopoulos - trombone
 Hector Del Curto - bandoneon
 Octavio Brunetti - piano
 Pedro Giraudo - bass
 Simon Powis - guitar
 Ian Rosenbaum - marimba
 Robert Thompson - piano
 Samuel Adams - bass
 Edson Schein - Violin
 Jiyun Han - violin
 Raul Garcia - Viola
 Arnold Choi - cello

Track listing
 "Michelangelo"
 "Cafe 1930"
 "Nightclub 1960"
 "Soledad"
 "Le Grand Tango"
 "Oblivion"
 "Escualo"
 "La muerte del angel"
 "Milonga del angel"
 "Resurrección del angel"

Production 
 Engineer - Mateusz Zechowski
 Mixing/Mastering - Dixon Van Winkle
 Producers - Achilles Liarmakopoulos & Gustavo Fernandez
 Liner notes - Constantine P. Carambelas-Sgourdas
 Cover art - Chrisa Liarmacopoulou

References

Tango albums
Tribute albums
2016 albums